Anton Rekhtin (born 15 September 1989) is a Russian professional ice hockey player. He is currently playing with Zauralie Kurgan of the Supreme Hockey League (VHL).

Rekhtin played five games in the Kontinental Hockey League with Metallurg Novokuznetsk during the 2009-10 season.

References

External links

1989 births
Living people
HC Izhstal players
Kuznetskie Medvedi players
Metallurg Novokuznetsk players
Rubin Tyumen players
Russian ice hockey centres
People from Novokuznetsk
Yermak Angarsk players
Zauralie Kurgan players
Sportspeople from Kemerovo Oblast